Göhren is a municipality in the Vorpommern-Rügen district, in Mecklenburg-Vorpommern, Germany.

Geography 

The municipality of Göhren adjoins the easternmost point of the island of Rugen: Cape Nordperd. It separates the North Beach (Nordstrand) from the South Beach (Südstrand). The North Beach is the actual bathing beach with a seaside promenade. Between Göhren Pier and the Nordperd lies the Buskam, the largest glacial erratic boulder in North Germany, which rises one metre about the sea.

Sights 

 Göhren Pier was rebuilt in the 1990s. It is 270 metres long.
 Speckbusch Barrow (Hügelgrab Speckbusch) is next to Göhren church and dates to the Bronze Age.
 The Mönchguter Museums are four museums that are protected and, together, form an open-air museum. There is a local history museum, the motor yacht Luise, the museum farm (since 1973), and a thatched fisherman's house, the Rookhuus.
 The Drachenhaus was the last home and workshop of the "Poet of the Baltic" and important playwright, Max Dreyer.
 Buskam: the largest glacial erratic in Germany is located ca. 300 metres offshore, east of Göhren.
 Memorial for the victims of Action Rose in 1953 on the Baltic Sea (Hotel Seestern, Poststraße 10)
 Göhren Village Church dates to the 20th century (1929/30).
 The area monument, the Hessenlager, on the road to Lobbe is an 1812 military camp.
 The beaches have a total length of 5 km and merge into each other.
 North Beach (Nordstrand): up to 30-metre-wide, white, fine-sand beach with a 270-metre-long pier
 South Beach (Südstrand): rockier and narrower beach, which runs to Lobbe.

References

External links

Towns and villages on Rügen
Seaside resorts in Germany
Mönchgut
 
Populated coastal places in Germany (Baltic Sea)